Leucascidae is a family of calcareous sponges in the order Clathrinida.

References

Clathrinida
Taxa named by Arthur Dendy